527 km is a rural locality (a passing loop) in Kalarskoye Rural Settlement of Tashtagolsky District, Russia. The population was 27 as of 2010.

Streets 
 Khrustalevskaya

Geography 
527 km is located 44 km northwest of Tashtagol (the district's administrative centre) by road. Kalary is the nearest rural locality.

References 

Rural localities in Kemerovo Oblast